Laodiceidae is a family of cnidarians belonging to the order Leptomedusae.

Genera:
 Guillea Bouillon, Pagès, Gili, Palanques, Puig & Heussner, 2000
 Laodicea Lesson, 1843
 Melicertissa Haeckel, 1879
 Octonema Haeckel, 1879
 Ptychogena Agassiz, 1865
 Ptychogenia Agassiz, 1865
 Staurostoma Haeckel, 1879
 Staurostoma Will, 1844
 Wuvula Bouillon, Seghers & Boero, 1988

References

Leptothecata
Cnidarian families